Friedrich VIII, Count of Zollern, nicknamed Easter Sunday (d. 1333) was a Count of Hohenzollern.

Life 
Friedrich was the younger son of the Count Friedrich VI of Hohenzollern from his marriage to Kunigunde (1265–1310), the daughter of Margrave Rudolf I of Baden.  After his elder brother Friedrich VII died in 1309, Frederik VIII ruled Zollern jointly with his nephew Fritz I.  After Fritz I died in 1313, Friedrich VIII ruled alone.

Friedrich VIII founded the Hohenzollern line when he divided the county with his brother.  In the power conflict of his time, Friedrich VIII supported the Austrian side, and later sided with Emperor Louis IV.

Issue 
The name of Friedrich's wife has not been preserved.  He had the following children:
 Fritz II (died between 1355 and 1359), Count of Zollern
 Friedrich IX (died between 1377 and 1379), Count of Hohenzollern, married in 1341 to Countess Adelheid of Hohenberg (d. after 1385)
 Friedrich "Easter Sunday" II (d. 1395), prior of the Order of Saint John
 Friedrich of Strasbourg (d. 1365), married in 1343 to Countess Margaret of Hohenberg-Wildberg, parents of:
 Frederick XI, Count of Hohenzollern.

Ancestry

See also 
 House of Hohenzollern

Footnotes

References 
 Count Rudolph Stillfried-Alcántara and Traugott Maercker: Hohenzollerische Forschungen, C. Reimarus, 1847, p. 172 ff

Counts of Zollern
Counts of Hohenzollern
13th-century births
1333 deaths
14th-century German nobility